Garavice was an extermination location established by the Independent State of Croatia (NDH) during World War II in Yugoslavia near Bihać, west Bosnia. Between 12,000 and 15,000 people, mostly Serb civilians, were murdered at Garavice by the Ustasha regime in 1941.

Garavice massacre is part of widespread genocide of Serbs, that included extermination, expulsions and forced religious conversions of large numbers of ethnic Serbs by the Ustasha regime in the Independent State of Croatia. These atrocities were carried out by Croat collaborators and Axis occupying forces during World War II.

Background
The Independent State of Croatia (NDH) was founded on 10 April 1941 by the Axis powers (after the invasion of Yugoslavia), who installed the fascist Ustasha organization as the puppet government. The Independent State of Croatia consisted of most of modern-day Croatia and all of modern-day Bosnia and Herzegovina, together with some parts of modern-day Serbia and Slovenia. NDH was the only nation beside Germany to operate extermination camps during World War II.

Some of the first decrees issued by the Poglavnik of the Independent State of Croatia, Ante Pavelić, reflected the NDH's adoption of the racist ideology of Nazi Germany towards Jews and Serbs.

Mass murders
Arrests of Serb and Jewish civilians in and around Bihać were ordered by Ljubomir Kvaternik, a county prefect, in June 1941. Arrestees were transported and executed at Garavice, near Bihać. In July 1941, the Ustashas murdered between 12,000 Serbs, Jews, and Roma in Garavice. The largest number of victims were Serbs. Corpses were thrown in mass graves at Garavice or tossed into the nearby Klokot and Una rivers. A large amount of blood contaminated the local water supply.

Memorial Park
In 1981, the Yugoslav government established a memorial park in Garavice, designed by renowned architect Bogdan Bogdanović and opened 39 years after the massacre. In 2011, the memorial park was declared a national monument of Bosnia and Herzegovina. Since then, however, the park has reportedly been neglected by the Bosnian government, and is overgrown with weeds and bushes, and desecrated with Nazi and Ustasha graffiti.

See also
 Genocide of Serbs in the Independent State of Croatia

References

External links 

1941 in Yugoslavia
Antiziganism in Europe
Concentration camps of the Independent State of Croatia
History of the Serbs of Bosnia and Herzegovina
History of the Serbs of Croatia
Holocaust massacres and pogroms
Massacres in the Independent State of Croatia
Persecution of Serbs
Massacres of Serbs
History of Bihać